The Popular Defense Forces (PDF) was a paramilitary force established under the Popular Defense Forces Act of 1989, it was also part of the Sudanese Armed Forces
before its dissolution in 2019 following the overthrow of Omar al-Bashir.

The force had close links with the National Islamic Front associated with former president Omar al-Bashir, and was originally formed as a dedicated Islamist militia. In 2015, the PDF largely operated as a reserve force for the Sudanese Armed Forces. Upon its foundation in 1989, several tribal militias throughout Sudan were integrated into the PDF, including the Messiria tribe's murahiliin, the Rizeigat tribe's fursan, and the Fertit Army of Peace.

In 2004, the Federal Research Division of the Library of Congress estimated that the Popular Defence Forces consisted of 10,000 active members, with 85,000 reserves. It had been deployed alongside regular army units against various rebel groups.

In 2020, rumors were circulating that the Sudanese Armed Forces had absorbed the former PDF. However, the SAF confirmed that the PDF had been dissolved and its headquarters seized.

References

Bibliography 

Arab militant groups
Military of Sudan